Colonel Richardson High School is located outside of Federalsburg, Maryland, United States and is part of the Caroline County Public Schools system.  the school serves approximately 526 students in grades nine to twelve. Students generally live in the southern end of Caroline County in Federalsburg, Maryland, Preston, Maryland, and a number of smaller towns.  Colonel Richardson Middle School serves as the feeder school.

History
In 1962 the Colonel Richardson High School was established. It consolidated two area high schools, Federalsburg High School and Preston High School.

The school was named after William Richardson, a Revolutionary War officer and state district court judge.

Administration
Principal: Nicole VonDenBosch 
Vice Principal: Jared Sherman
Dean of Students: Bradley Oberdorf

Academics
Students at Colonel Richardson High School participate in courses in accordance with the Caroline County Public Schools High School Program of Study.  To earn a high school diploma, students must earn four English credits, four math credits, three science credits, three social studies credits, a financial literacy credit, a fine art credit, a technology education credit, a physical education credit, a health credit, and other credits as defined by their chosen career majors.

Available career majors include:
Computer-Aided Drafting and Design
Construction Technology
Criminal Justice and Homeland Security
Advanced Manufacturing Program
Cosmetology
Food & Beverage Management
Agricultural Sciences
Biomedical Sciences (Project Lead the Way)
Academy of Health Professions
Teacher Academy of Maryland
Firefighter and Emergency Medical Responder
Computer Science
Engineering (Project Lead the Way)
Automotive Technician
Liberal Arts
Military Service

Select programs are completed at the Caroline Career and Technology Center in Denton, MD as well as the Chesapeake Culinary Center in Denton, MD (Food & Beverage Management), the Maryland Fire and Rescue Institute in Centreville, MD (Firefighter and Emergency Medical Responder), and Easton High School in Easton, MD (Military Service).

Athletics
Students at CRHS can participate in the following sports:
Football
Cheerleading
Golf
Boys' Soccer
Girls' Soccer
Volleyball 
Boys' Basketball
Girls' Basketball
Wrestling 
Tennis
Baseball - State Champions 2007 and 2019
Softball - State Champions 1993 and 1996
Track and Field

Clubs and organizations
Students at CRHS can participate in the following clubs and organizations:
Art Club
Multiple Music Ensembles, including:
 Marching Band
 Wind Ensemble (Concert Band)
 Jazz Ensemble
 Concert Choir
 String and Full Orchestra
 Pep Percussion
 Pit Orchestra
Tri-M Music Honor Society
National Honor Society
National Technical Honor Society
Sociedad Honoraria Hispánica (Spanish National Honor Society)
Société Honoraire de Français (French National Honor Society)
Drama Club
Leo Club
Gender-Sexuality Alliance
Purple Club
Educators Rising
Spirit Club
Yearbook

Demographics
White: 66%
Black: 24%
Hispanic: 5%
Two or More Races: 5%
Asian/Pacific Islander: <.5%
American Indian/Alaskan Native: <.5%

 55% of students are eligible for the free or reduced lunch program.

Notable alumni
 William Oswald Mills (Federalsburg High School, 1941), U.S. Representative
 Jean Patchett (Preston High School, 1941), fashion model
 Marvin H. Smith (Federalsburg High School, 1933), judge of the Maryland Court of Appeals
 Nick Woodward, racing driver

References

External links
 
 Caroline County Public Schools

Public high schools in Maryland
Educational institutions established in 1962
Schools in Caroline County, Maryland
1962 establishments in Maryland